Oleksandr Irvanets (born 24 January 1961) is a Ukrainian poet, writer, playwright, and translator.

References

Ukrainian poets
1961 births
Living people
People of the Revolution on Granite
Ukrainian writers
Ukrainian dramatists and playwrights
Ukrainian translators
Place of birth missing (living people)